Hasso von Wedel (20 November 1898 – 3 January 1961) was a German general who commanded the Wehrmacht Propaganda Troops during World War II. He was directly subordinate to the head of OKW Operations Staff (Wehrmachtführungsstab, WFSt.), General Alfred Jodl. Wedel's Propaganda Department had control over the propaganda units and served to mediate between them and the Reich Propaganda Ministry of Joseph Goebbels.

After the capitulation of Nazi Germany, Wedel was taken prisoner by US troops on 6 May 1945 and released on 18 May 1946. Wedel described his experience on war propaganda in an apologetic account written between 1957 and 1958 and published after his death under the title Die Propagandatruppen der Deutschen Wehrmacht ("The Wehrmacht's Propaganda Troops"). For example, he described the relations between the Wehrmacht and civilian propaganda organizations as allegedly problematic, while they cooperated successfully and effectively throughout the war. 

Wedel and Alfred Ingemar Berndt were editors of Deutschland im Kampf, a book series, 43 volumes, almost 10,000 pages, covering every battle in which the German Army, Kriegsmarine and Luftwaffe were involved, from the invasion of Poland in September 1939 to mid-1944.

Books authored (German)
 Schießtechnik und Taktik des einzelnen f. M.G. in 26 Kampfaufgaben mit Lösungen. Berlin 1928
 Zwanzig Jahre deutsche Wehrmacht. Berlin 1939
 Der Kampf im Westen. München: Raumbild-Verlag Otto Schönstein, 1940. 
 Der Feldherr Adolf Hitler und seine Marschälle. Leipzig 1941
 Die Propagandatruppen der Deutschen Wehrmacht. Hrsg. von Hermann Teske. Neckargemünd  1962
 Germany at War (Deutschland im Kampf) (Otto Stollberg, Berlin 1939-1944). Alfred Ingemar Berndt and Hasso von Wedel, editors.
 Defense Education and People's Education (Wehrerziehung und Volkserziehung) Hanseatische Verlagsanstalt Hamburg 1938

References

Bibliography
 Daniel Uziel: The Propaganda Warriors. The Wehrmacht and the Consolidation of the German Home Front. Peter Lang, Oxford  2008, .
 

1890s births
1961 deaths
People from Stargard
People from the Province of Pomerania
Recipients of the Iron Cross (1914), 1st class
Prussian Army personnel
Reichswehr personnel
Major generals of the German Army (Wehrmacht)
Nazi propagandists
Recipients of the Knights Cross of the War Merit Cross
Wedel family